The 2010 Stockholm Ladies Cup was held from November 4 to 7 at the Danderyds Curling AB in Stockholm, Sweden as part of the 2010–11 World Curling Tour. The event was held in a triple-knockout format, and the playoffs were held in a modified double-knockout format. The purse for the event was 30,000 SEK, with the winner, Mirjam Ott, receiving 10,000 SEK.

Teams

Knockout results

A event

B event

C event

Playoffs qualifiers

A qualifiers

B qualifiers

Playoffs

External links

Stockholm Ladies Cup
2010 in Swedish women's sport
2010 in women's curling
2010s in Stockholm
November 2010 sports events in Europe